Synemon collecta, the striated sun moth, is a moth in the family Castniidae. The species was first described by Charles Swinhoe in 1892. It is found in Australia, including Victoria, New South Wales and Queensland. The population in Victoria might represent an undescribed allied species.

The wingspan is about 39 mm for males and 41 mm for females. Adults have brown forewings and bright yellow hindwings. The common name refers to the whitish striations and markings found on the upperside of the forewings.

Adults are on wing from late December to mid-January.

The larvae feed on the roots of various grass species, including Austrodanthonia laevis and other Austrodanthonia species. They spend most of their life underground.

References

Moths described in 1892
Castniidae